
Robert Weber may refer to:

Robert R. Weber (born 1925), American politician

Cartoonists
Bob Weber (cartoonist) (1934–2020), creator of the comic strip Moose and Molly
Robert Weber (cartoonist) (1924–2016), New Yorker cartoonist
Bob Weber, Jr., cartoonist and creator of the comic strip Slylock Fox

Scientists and academics
 Robert Weber (astronomer) (1926–2008), American astronomer
 Robert Weber (engineer) (1942–2018), American engineer and academic
 Robert J. Weber (born 1947), American academic and educator

Sportspeople
Bob Weber (American football) (1934–2008), coach of two American college football teams
Robert Weber (handballer) (born 1985), Austrian handball player
Robert Weber (gymnast) (born 1984), German gymnast

See also
Robert Weber Round Barn, Illinois
Robert Webber (disambiguation)